Terefundus is a genus of sea snails, marine gastropod mollusks in the family Muricidae, the murex snails or rock snails.

Species
Species within the genus Terefundus include:
 Terefundus anomalus Dell, 1956
 Terefundus axirugosus Dell, 1956
 Terefundus crispulatus (Suter, 1908)
 Terefundus cuvierensis (Mestayer, 1919)
 †Terefundus lamelliferus P. A. Maxwell, 1988 
 † Terefundus murdochi (Marwick, 1924) 
 Terefundus quadricinctus (Suter, 1908)
Species brought into synonymy
 Terefundus crassiliratus (Suter, 1908): synonym of Minortrophon crassiliratus (Suter, 1908)
 Terefundus unicarinatus Dell, 1956: synonym of Terefundus quadricinctus unicarinatus Dell, 1956

References

Pagodulinae
Gastropod genera